Perry Paris Moise (born September 21, 1996), better known by his stage name TheGoodPerry (formerly known as Burberry Perry), is an American record producer and hip hop recording artist. Perry gained recognition for his production in Lil Yachty's hit debut single "One Night" from his debut mixtape Lil Boat in 2016. In May 2016, Perry released his debut self-titled EP Burberry Perry. On July 27, 2016, Perry changed his name from Burberry Perry to TheGoodPerry because of a lawsuit filed from the British clothing-line Burberry. Perry frequently collaborates with Lil Yachty, playing a part in Summer Songs 2. On March 16, 2018, Lil Yachty explained on Twitter how he and Perry do not talk anymore, but they do not necessarily have beef.

Legal issues
On July 25, 2016, British clothing line Burberry sued Perry for using their name for his own personal profit. The company also sued for his cover artwork on his self-titled EP Burberry Perry, which featured an altered version of the Burberry plaid design and knight logo. In response, Perry changed his name from Burberry Perry to TheGoodPerry.

Discography

Extended plays

Mixtapes

Singles

As lead artist

Guest appearances

Production discography

2015 

 Wintertime Zi and Lil Yachty - Hey Honey, Let's Spend Wintertime On a Boat
 01. "Courtside Choppas"
 03. "Mossed" (featuring Nessly)
 04. "Remember December"

2016 

 Lil Yachty - Lil Boat
 01. "Intro / Just Keep Swimming"
 02. "Wanna Be Us" (featuring TheGoodPerry) [produced with Colby Crump]
 10. "One Night"
 13. "I'm Sorry" (featuring TheGoodPerry)
 14. "We Did It (Positivity Song)"

 Lil Yachty - Summer Songs 2
 01. "Intro (First Day of Summer)"
 10. "Yeah Yeah"
 12. "Such Ease" (featuring TheGoodPerry and Tyler Royale)

2017 

 Lil Yachty - Teenage Emotions
 16. "Running with the Ghost" (featuring Grace)

2018 
 ELS - What Girls Do — feat. Lil Pump — Single
 1. "What Girls Do" (featuring Lil Pump)

References

1996 births
Living people
American hip hop record producers